Foreign Languages Publishing House may refer to:

Foreign Languages Publishing House (North Korea), Pyongyang
Foreign Languages Publishing House (Soviet Union), Moscow
Foreign Languages Publishing House (Vietnam), Hanoi

See also
Foreign Languages Press, Beijing, China